The women's 48 kilograms (Extra lightweight) competition at the 2014 Asian Games in Incheon was held on 20 September at the Dowon Gymnasium.

Mönkhbatyn Urantsetseg of Mongolia won the gold medal.

Schedule
All times are Korea Standard Time (UTC+09:00)

Results

Main bracket

Repechage

References

External links
 
 Official website

W48
Judo at the Asian Games Women's Extra Lightweight
Asian W48